Appo Hocton (c. 1823 – 26 September 1920), with a birth name of Wong Ahpoo Hock Ting or Wong Ah Poo Hock Ting, his Chinese name was 黃鶴庭，was a Chinese-born New Zealand servant, landlord, carter and farmer. Born in about 1823, he was the first recorded Chinese emigrant to New Zealand, arriving in Nelson on the Thomas Harrison on 25 October 1842.

Hocton purchased land in Nelson's Washington Valley, where he built eight cottages, four of which still exist today; they are located at 40 Washington Road, and nearby at 16, 38, and 40 Hastings Street.

In 1876 Appo Hocton moved to Dovedale, Tasman onto a 485-acre block of land near Brandy Creek, after clearing the land Appo farmed cattle and sheep. Appo died on the 26 September 1920 at the purported age of 103. He was buried at Dovedale Cemetery although some believe he was buried behind his home at Dovedale, Tasman.

References

1823 births
1920 deaths
New Zealand farmers
Chinese emigrants to New Zealand
Servants
People from Nelson, New Zealand
New Zealand domestic workers
New Zealand landlords
19th-century landowners